Luxembourg, Luxembourg is a 2022 Ukrainian comedy film written and directed by Antonio Lukich. 

The film premiered at the Horizons section of the 79th edition of the Venice Film Festival. It was later screened at the Toronto International Film Festival.

Plot

Cast 
Amil Nasirov as Kolya
Ramil Nasirov as   Vasya
Lyudmyla Sachenko as   Larysa Petrivna

Reception
On Rotten Tomatoes, the film has an approval rating of 80% based on 5 reviews.

References

External links
 

2022 comedy films
Ukrainian comedy films